Mingering Mike (born 1950) is a fictitious funk and soul recording and visual artist created in the late 1960s as the subject of works of album art by a young Mike Stevens.  More recently, Mingering Mike was rediscovered by law firm investigator Dori Hadar and his friend Frank Beylotte, who came across the art work at a flea market.  Mingering Mike had created a whole complex yet non-existent music career, including a Bruce Lee concept album, and had made more than 50 album covers in ten years.  When Mike was rediscovered, it was learned that he had unreleased musical material from the same period. It was eventually released as a real album.  Mingering Mike at first refused to release his real name or allow a photo to be taken of him, because he was afraid that his new celebrity status would cause him to lose his two-day jobs.

Mike's original album covers were first exhibited at the Southeastern Center for Contemporary Art in 2005.

In 2007, Dori Hadar's book about Mike's work, The Amazing Career of an Imaginary Soul Superstar, was published by Princeton Architectural Press.

In 2010, Mike's original record cover work was featured in the exhibition and publication The Record: Contemporary Art and Vinyl at the Nasher Museum of Art at Duke University.

The Smithsonian American Art Museum in Washington, DC acquired the Mingering Mike Collection in 2012.

References

External links 

The Record: Contemporary Art and Vinyl 
eMusic Selects feature: Mingering Mike
Mingering Mike, Super Gold Greatest Hits  
Swindle Magazine

Fictional singers